The Boxing Tournament at the 2001 Mediterranean Games was held in Tunis, Tunisia from September 6 to September 8.

Medal winners

Medal table

References
2001 Mediterranean Games report at the International Committee of Mediterranean Games (CIJM) website
2001 Mediterranean Games boxing tournament at Amateur Boxing Results

Medi
Sports at the 2001 Mediterranean Games
2001